The Kawagoe City Industry and Tourism Center is a commercial facility in Kawagoe City, Saitama Prefecture. It was established by Kawagoe  City after converting  of the former sake brewery.
The facility opened on October 1, 2010 with the nickname of ‘Koedo Kurari’.

Origins and history 

The Kawagoe City Industry and Tourism Center opened in October 2010 (22nd year of the Heisei Era)  by preserving and renovating  (registered tangible cultural properties) of the former Kagamiyama Brewery, which started business in 1875 (8th 
year of the Meiji Era).
The former Kagamiyama Brewery is the last sake brewery doing business in Kawagoe, with its  constructed in the Meiji era, Taisho Era and Showa Era remaining. It went out of business in 2000 (12th year of the Heisei Era).
In order to meet a request from citizens to preserve and utilize the historical and cultural facilities, Kawagoe City obtained the land and the buildings to design and establish a facility for local industry and tourism.
This facility is aimed at offering opportunities for citizens and tourists 
to mingle, revitalizing the city. Local products are displayed for 
sale.
 include Meiji Kura for souvenirs, Taisho Kura for a restaurant and Showa kura for sake tasting.

The origin of its nickname ‘Koedo Kurari’:
‘Koedo’ is the nickname of Kawagoe City. The word ‘Koedo’ was combined with ‘Kura’ which relates to Kawagoe’s famous Kurazukuri, and ‘Ri’ which is associated with one’s home.

History 
1875 (8th year of the Meiji Era)  Kagamiyama Brewery started business
2000 (12th year of the Heisei Era)  Kagamiyama Brewery went out of business
2008 (20th year of the Heisei Era)  Three storehouses of former Kagamiyama Brewery were registered as tangible cultural property
2010 (22nd year of the Heisei Era)  Kawagoe City Industry and Tourism Center (Koedo Kurari) opened
2018 (30th year of the Heisei Era) Showa kura renewal opened (sake tasting)

Architectural overview 
Address: 1-10-1 shintomi-cho, Kawagoe, Saitama
Use districts: industrial districts, building coverage ratio 80% floor-area ratio 400%
Fire prevention districts: quasi-fire prevention districts 
Site area: 3,064.09 m2
Total floor area: 1,234 m2
Meiji Kura: 419 m2, two-story storehouse building, partly one-story, constructed in the middle Meiji Era
Taisho Kura: 305 m2, two-story wooden building, partly one-story, constructed in the early Taisho Era     
Showa Kura: 232 m2, two-story storehouse building, constructed in the sixth year of the Showa Era
Tenji kura: 278 m2 one-story wooden building, construction date unknown
Open space: 500 m2

Cultural properties 
Registered tangible cultural property (structures)
Registration date: March 7, 2008 (20th year of the Heisei Era)
Type: Industrial second/Structures
Registration criteria: contributing to historical scenery of national land

Former Kagamiyama Brewery Meiji Kura
Date 1868–1911 (middle Meiji Era) construction, two-story storehouse building, 
partly one-story tile-roofing  building area
Former Kgamiyama Brewery Taisho Kura
Date 1912–1925 (early Taisho Era) construction, two-story wooden building, 
partly one-story tile-roofing building area
Former Kagamiyama Brewery Showa Kura
Date 1931 (Showa Era) construction, two-story storehouse building, tile-roofing, 
building area

References

Related items 
Kawagoe City’s Koedo Kurari Kagamiyama Brewery, originating in the eighth year of the Meiji Era, was converted to Koedo Kurari (registered tangible cultural property) by Koedo Kurari, kept at the National Diet Library.

See also 
 Kawagoe Station
 Hon-Kawagoe Station
 Kawagoe, Saitama

External links 
  Koedo Kurari official website 
 Kawagoe City Koedo Kurari: official website 

Buildings and structures in Kawagoe, Saitama
Tourist attractions in Saitama Prefecture